= Arook =

Traditional Iraqi dish

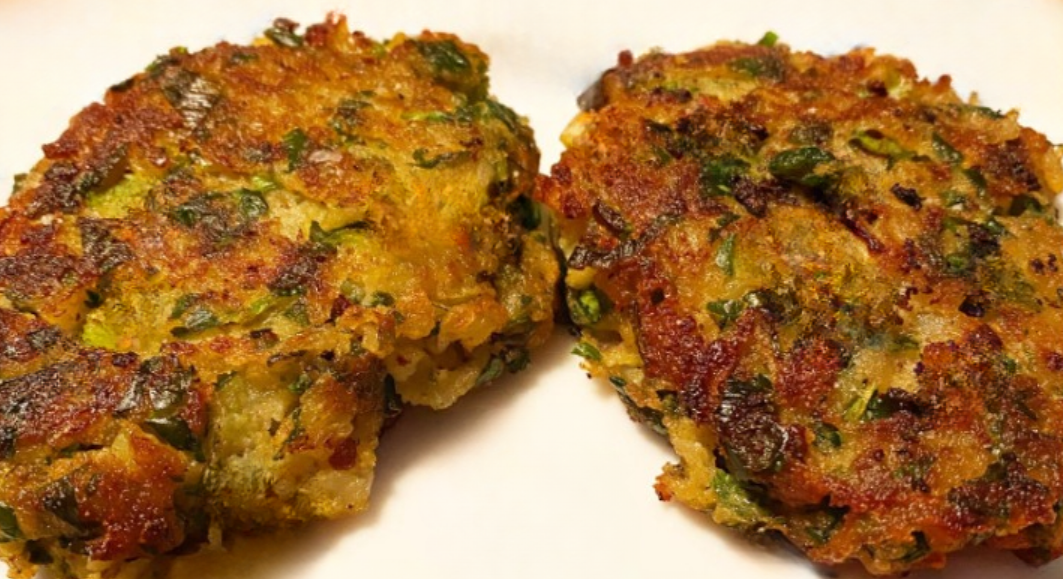
- Arook
- Region or state: Iraq

Arook (Arabic: عروق) is a traditional Iraqi dish, enjoyed by Iraqis and people of the Middle East.

The dish is composed of potatoes, parsley, salt, onion, egg, flour, black pepper, and green onions, which are chopped, mixed together, and fried.

In addition to the vegetarian version, there is also a version containing ground beef or chicken, carrots, and raisins.
